The 2007 Mil Milhas Brasil was the 35th running of the Mil Milhas Brasil (1000 Miles of Brasil) and was the sixth and final race of the 2007 Le Mans Series season.  It took place at the Autódromo José Carlos Pace, Brazil, on 10 November 2007.  It is the first round of the Le Mans Series held outside of Europe, as well as the first event longer than 1000 kilometers.  The race lasted 8 hours 58 minutes.

Official results
Class winners in bold.  Cars failing to complete 70% of winner's distance marked as Not Classified (NC).

Statistics
 Pole position - #7 Team Peugeot Total - 1:41.867
 Fastest lap - #8 Team Peugeot Total - 1:18.787
 Average speed - 179.607 km/h

References

External links

 Le Mans Series - Mil Milhas Brasil
 Mil Milhas Brasil - Official website

2007 in Brazilian motorsport
2007 Le Mans Series season
Mil Milhas Brasil seasons
November 2007 sports events in South America